Uday Narayan Rai, also known as Bhola Babu and Bhola Rai, is an Indian politician from the state of Bihar. He was a member of Bihar Legislative Assembly from Raghopur and served as a state cabinet minister in the governments of Lalu Prasad Yadav and Rabri Devi. He was elected as the Member of the Legislative Assembly (MLA) three times in the Bihar Assembly elections of 1980, 1985 and 1990.

Political career
Rai won the seat of Raghopur constituency for three consecutive terms in 1980, 1985 and 1990. He vacated the seat upon the directive of Lalu Prasad Yadav in 1995 so that Lalu Prasad Yadav could contest from the constituency in the 1995 election. He served as a cabinet minister in the governments of Lalu Prasad Yadav and Rabri Devi.

In 2020, he quit Rashtriya Janata Dal following not being nominated as a Member of Legislative Council, and announced that he would support National Democratic Alliance (NDA) against Tejashwi Yadav, the incumbent MLA of Raghopur. In September 2020, he joined Janata Dal (United).

References

Bihar MLAs 1980–1985
Bihar MLAs 1985–1990
Bihar MLAs 1990–1995
People from Vaishali district
Rashtriya Janata Dal politicians
Janata Dal politicians
Janata Party politicians
Lok Dal politicians
Year of birth missing (living people)
Living people